Dipika Kakar Ibrahim (born 6 August 1986) is an Indian actress who works in Hindi television. She is known for playing Simar in Sasural Simar Ka and Sonakshi in Kahaan Hum Kahaan Tum. She participated in the reality show Bigg Boss 12 and emerged as the winner in 2018. She also participated in Nach Baliye 8.

Early life
Dipika was born on 6 August 1986 in Pune, India. Kakar completed her school level exams conducted by the Central Board of Secondary Education and then graduated from the University of Mumbai. After completing her studies she started working as a flight attendant with Jet Airways for almost 3 years. Due to some health issues, she resigned and joined the entertainment industry.

Personal life

First Kakar was married to Raunak Samson in 2011 but they got separated in 2015. Then, she married Shoaib Ibrahim, her co-star from Sasural Simar Ka on 22 February 2018 in Bhopal. She converted to Islam and changed her name to Faiza.

Career
Kakar started her career as an Air Hostess for three years in Mumbai. Then, she made her television debut in 2010 with Neer Bhare Tere Naina Devi where she played Lakshmi. She then appeared in Agle Janam Mohe Bitiya Hi Kijo as Rekha.

From 2011 to 2017, she portrayed Simar Bhardwaj in Colors TV's Sasural Simar Ka. In 2015, Kakar participated in the celebrity dance reality show Jhalak Dikhhla Jaa 8. In 2017, she participated in Star Plus's Nach Baliye 8 with Shoaib Ibrahim. She next appeared in Entertainment Ki Raat.

In October 2018, Kakar participated in Bigg Boss 12. On 30 December 2018, she emerged as the winner of the season.

In 2019 and 2020, she portrayed Sonakshi Rastogi in Star Plus's Kahaan Hum Kahaan Tum opposite Karan Grover.

Filmography

Television

Special appearances

Films

Music videos

Awards and nominations

See also

 List of Indian television actresses

References

External links 

 
 

1986 births
Living people
Indian television actresses
Actresses in Hindi television
Indian soap opera actresses
Actresses from Pune
21st-century Indian actresses
Bigg Boss (Hindi TV series) contestants
Converts to Islam from Hinduism
Big Brother (franchise) winners